Cycling Team–Titanedi–Frezza Acca Due O (UCI team code: TFA) was an Italian professional cycling team, which competed in elite road bicycle racing events such as the UCI Women's Road World Cup.

Major wins
2008
Stages 2 & 3 Tour de Pologne Feminin, Giorgia Bronzini
Stage 7 La Route de France Féminine, Giorgia Bronzini
Stages 1, 2, 3 & 4 Trophée d'Or Féminin, Giorgia Bronzini
Züri Metzgete, Giorgia Bronzini

References

Cycling teams based in Italy
UCI Women's Teams
Cycling teams established in 2008